In law, an entitlement is a provision made in accordance with a legal framework of a society. Typically, entitlements are based on concepts of principle ("rights") which are themselves based in concepts of social equality or enfranchisement.

In psychology, entitlement mentality is defined as a sense of deservingness or being owed a favor when little or nothing has been done to deserve special treatment.

Psychology 

An inflated sense of what is sometimes called psychological entitlement – unrealistic, exaggerated, or rigidly held – is especially prominent among narcissists. According to the DSM-5, individuals with narcissistic personality disorder (NPD) are likely to have a "sense of entitlement to special treatment and to obedience from others," typically without commensurate qualities or accomplishments: Similarly, according to Sam Vaknin, the narcissistic personality attempts to protect the vulnerable self by building layers of grandiosity and a huge sense of entitlement. Similar to individuals with narcissistic personality disorder, those with borderline personality disorder display a strong sense of entitlement, according to research conducted by Dr. John Gunderson and Dr. Elsa Ronningstam. Ronningstam and Gunderson state, "Characteristics shared by the two disorders and thus failing to discriminate between NPD and BPD are notable. A sense of entitlement occurred in both diagnostic groups in Morey's and our studies; that is, both narcissists and borderlines felt that others should recognize their needs and give them special favours."

An earned sense of entitlement is usually more beneficial than a purely-psychological entitlement. Still, the former may also have a destructive counterpart in the sense of a felt entitlement to revenge based on the accumulation of grievances. 

Psychoanalysis differentiated among children three main varieties of the sense of entitlement: normal, inflated, and compromised. The inflated sense of entitlement sought special privileges for the individual alone, perhaps to compensate for childhood suffering or narcissistic injury. The compromised sense involved an inability to expect the basic rights enjoyed by those around one. A normal or healthy sense of entitlement included an expectation of responsiveness from significant others, a sense of agency, and a sense of one's right to one's feelings, all of which form positive elements in self-esteem.

Ivan Boszormenyi-Nagy distinguished in adult life between (ethically) earning entitlement in relationships, which comes from care and consideration, and a subjective feeling of entitlement, the real basis for which may be very different. Thus, the depressive may have an unjustifiably-low sense of entitlement, and the manic may have an exaggeratedly high one. The gambler may feel entitled to expect a big win to compensate for childhood deprivation. Those who clamor most loudly for such reimbursement from fate may, in fact, unconsciously doubt their entitlement to anything at all.

See also

Legal

References

Further reading 

 Hill, Jess. See What You Made Me Do. Black Books Inc. Sydney. 2019.

 Twenge, Jean M.; Campbell, W., Keith The Narcissism Epidemic: Living in the Age of Entitlement (2009)

External links

Development studies
Narcissism
Rights
Social status